Prophet River is a First Nations reserve community of the Dunne-za (Beaver) people in northeastern British Columbia, Canada, located at Mile 233 on Highway 97, the Alaska Highway, about 54 miles south of Fort Nelson. The community observes Mountain Standard Time year-round, as does Fort Nelson since November 1, 2015.

Unincorporated settlements in British Columbia
Indian reserves in British Columbia
Populated places in the Northern Rockies Regional Municipality
Peace River Country
Dane-zaa